is a 2022 Polish–Japanese cyberpunk web anime series based on the video game Cyberpunk 2077 by CD Projekt Red. The series was animated by Studio Trigger under the supervision of CD Projekt and premiered on Netflix in September 2022. Set in the Cyberpunk universe created by Mike Pondsmith, the anime serves as a prequel to the game and takes place about a year before the events of Cyberpunk 2077.

Upon its release, Cyberpunk: Edgerunners received highly positive reviews, with praise directed at its characters, animation and worldbuilding. In October 2022, CD Projekt announced that the anime would not be receiving a second season and stated that, while they were open to collaborating with Trigger for future projects, Cyberpunk: Edgerunners had always been planned as a standalone work.

Synopsis

Setting 

Cyberpunk: Edgerunners is set in Night City, a self-reliant metropolis located in the Free State of California that suffers from extensive corruption, cybernetic addiction, and gang violence. The city is split into six districts, each of which has its own precise living requirements, and is controlled by several megacorporations, including Arasaka and its rival Militech. The anime's story is primarily set in Santo Domingo, the oldest, poorest, and most industrial district of Night City.

Plot
In a dystopia overrun by corruption, crime, and cybernetic implants, an impulsive but talented street kid named David, after losing everything he has in a drive-by shooting, makes the choice to survive on the wrong side of the law as an "edgerunner": a high-tech, black-market mercenary also known as a "cyberpunk".

Characters

A Latino American teenager who is a top student at the prestigious Arasaka Academy. Due to coming from a poor family, he is relentlessly bullied by his classmates and feels like he does not belong at school. A sudden and devastating tragedy leads him to abandon his education and puts him on the path of becoming an edgerunner.

A young netrunner who becomes romantically involved with David and introduces him to the criminal underworld of Night City. She has a particular hatred towards Arasaka and dreams of traveling to the Moon.

A trigger-happy edgerunner and a member of Maine's crew. She is also Pilar's younger sister.

A veteran edgerunner who commands his own crew. He is one of Gloria's clients and allows David to join the crew under his guidance.

Maine's girlfriend and second-in-command.

A foul-mouthed techie and a member of Maine's crew. He is also Rebecca's older brother.

A veteran netrunner who is often cold and stoic, and a member of Maine's crew.

A member of Maine's crew who works as the group's getaway driver.

A fixer who works for Militech. He has a business relationship with Maine's crew and often hires them to conduct jobs that usually involve them performing corporate espionage against Arasaka. 

A local ripperdoc who helps upgrade and install David's cybernetic implants, as well as providing him with the required immunosuppressants.

David's mother and a paramedic who works herself to the bone to pay for his tuition at the Arasaka Academy.

A bloodthirsty and fully cybernetic supersoldier who works for Arasaka as their chief of security. His English voice actor, Alec Newman, reprises the role from Cyberpunk 2077.

Production and release
The series was announced during a "Night City Wire" livestream for the game on June 25, 2020, as a collaboration between CD Projekt and Studio Trigger. Hiroyuki Imaishi directed the series, with Masahiko Otsuka and Yoshiki Usa writing scripts, Yoh Yoshinari designing the characters and serving as animation director, Yuto Kaneko and Yusuke Yoshigaki serving as assistant character designers, Hiroyuki Kaneko serving as assistant director, Hiromi Wakabayashi serving as creative director, and Akira Yamaoka serving as the show's composer. The anime's opening theme is "This Fffire" by Franz Ferdinand, while its ending theme is "Let You Down" by Dawid Podsiadło. Edgerunners also utilized songs from 2077s in-game radio stations. Rosa Walton's song "I Really Want to Stay at Your House" was featured prominently and critically praised.

Episodes

Reception

Critical response
Cyberpunk: Edgerunners was acclaimed by critics and fans.  

Jonathon Wilson wrote for Ready Steady Cut that in "many ways, this is the Cyberpunk story the Cyberpunk game wanted to tell and couldn’t." Matt Kim of IGN praised the exploration of the hostile life in Night City, specifically the visual effects, noting more of the focus was on the city rather than on some of the characters, and calling it "a wild ride, but worth every blistering second". In a review for Polygon, Kambole Campbell praised the "visual language for various in-game concepts," as well as the "sonic diversity in its score" and found that the show's best aspect was "[its] ability to depict the psychological unmooring of its characters without feeling inauthentic."

Video game director Hideo Kojima lauded the show as well, calling it "a miracle of squeezing the trigger to the world", and compared the art and world design favorably to the 1990 OVA series Cyber City Oedo 808. Mike Pondsmith, the creator of the original Cyberpunk role-playing game also praised the show, writing "It's like seeing my brain in a big screen anime." The publisher of the tabletop Cyberpunk game, R. Talsorian, announced plans for an Edgerunners-based expansion in November 2022.

Accolades

Future
In an interview with Famitsu, CDPR community manager Satoru Honma said of Cyberpunk: Edgerunners that no plans exist for a second season but that if ever there would be, it would not be a continuation of the first season but "something completely different."

References

External links
 
 
 
 

2022 anime ONAs
Polish adult animated television series
Anime based on video games
Biorobotics in fiction
Crime in anime and manga
Crunchyroll Anime Awards winners
Cybernetted society in fiction
Cyberpunk anime and manga
Cyberpunk (role-playing game)
Fiction about corporate warfare
Gangs in fiction
Malware in fiction
Megacities in fiction
Nanotechnology in fiction
Neo-noir
Netflix original anime
Organized crime in anime and manga
Prosthetics in fiction
Studio Trigger
Television series set in the 2070s